Spurious may refer to: 

 Spurious relationship in statistics
 Spurious emission or spurious tone in radio engineering
 Spurious key in cryptography
 Spurious interrupt in computing
 Spurious wakeup in computing
 Spurious, a 2011 novel by Lars Iyer